The 1966 NBA World Championship Series was the championship round of the 1966 NBA Playoffs, which concluded the National Basketball Association (NBA)'s 1965–66 season. The Eastern Division champion Boston Celtics faced the Western Division champion Los Angeles Lakers in a best-of-seven series that the Celtics won 4 games to 3. For the Celtics this was their tenth straight finals appearance, which tied a North American professional sports record set by the National Hockey League's Montreal Canadiens from 1951 to 1960, and the National Football League's Cleveland Browns from 1946 to 1955.

Thus Boston won its eighth consecutive league title, which no other team has achieved in North American professional sports competition. Before Game 2, after the Los Angeles Lakers' comeback overtime win in Game 1, Red Auerbach, who had challenged the entire league to topple the Celtics from their reign by announcing he would retire after 1965–1966 before the season had started (thus giving his detractors "one last shot" at him), announced Bill Russell as the Celtics' coach for 1966–1967 and beyond. He would be the first African-American to coach in the NBA. Laker coach Fred Schaus privately fumed that Auerbach's hiring had taken away all of the accolades his Lakers should have received following their tremendous Game 1 win. The Celtics won the next three games and looked ready to close out L.A. in Game 5. However, the Lakers won the next two games, setting the stage for another classic Game 7 in the Boston Garden. The Celtics raced out to a huge lead, and held off a late Los Angeles rally to capture the NBA title and send Red Auerbach out a champion.

This was the last NBA championship series until 2016 in which a team trailing 3 games to 1 rallied to force a Game 7.

Series summary

Celtics win series 4–3

Team rosters

Boston Celtics

{| class="toccolours" style="font-size: 95%; width: 100%;"
|-
! colspan="2" style="background-color: #008040;  color: #FFFFFF; text-align: center;" | Boston Celtics 1965–66 roster
|- style="background-color: #FFFFFF; color: #008040;   text-align: center;"
! Players !! Coaches
|- 
| valign="top" |
{| class="sortable" style="background:transparent; margin:0px; width:100%;"
! Pos. !! # !! Nat. !! Name !! Ht. !! Wt. !! From
|-

Los Angeles Lakers

See also
 1966 NBA Playoffs
 1965–66 NBA season

External links
 1966 Finals at NBA.com
 1966 NBA Playoffs at Basketball-Reference.com

National Basketball Association Finals
NBA
NBA
Finals
NBA Finals
Basketball competitions in Boston
Basketball competitions in Los Angeles
1960s in Boston
NBA Finals
NBA Finals
NBA Finals